Kévin Igier (born 4 March 1987) is a French professional ice hockey defenceman who plays for Diables Rouges de Briançon in the Ligue Magnus.

He participated at the 2010 IIHF World Championship as a member of the France men's national ice hockey team.

References

External links

1987 births
Living people
Anglet Hormadi Élite players
Chamonix HC players
Diables Rouges de Briançon players
Dragons de Rouen players
Ducs d'Angers players
Ducs de Dijon players
French ice hockey defencemen
Ice hockey people from Paris